İsmail Safa Giray (5 March 1931 – 20 June 2011) was a Turkish civil engineer and politician from the Motherland Party (ANAP). He was a member of the Turkish parliament and served as Minister of Public Works and Housing, Minister of National Defense, and Minister of Foreign Affairs.

Early life and education
Safa Giray was born in İzmir, Turkey in 1931, as a descendant of the former Giray Dynasty. He graduated in 1954 with a degree from the Faculty of Civil Engineering at Istanbul Technical University.

Career

Safa Giray entered politics in 1983 along with Turgut Özal from the beginnings of the Motherland Party and was elected into the parliament as an MP from Balıkesir Province. He held the office of Minister of Public Works and Settlement  (13 December 1983 – 30 March 1989) in two Turgut Özal cabinets, Minister of National Defense (30 March 1989 – 19 October 1990) in the Yıldırım Akbulut cabinet. He resigned from the position because of inter-party and cabinet conflicts. Later, he was appointed Minister of Foreign Affairs (23 June 1991 – 21 November 1991) by Prime minister Mesut Yılmaz. He left politics in 1999 after 16 years.

In 1993, Safa Giray was accused of fraud and misuse of authority during his time of service as Minister of Public Works. He was tried before the Supreme Court in conjunction with the awarding of contracts for motorway construction. He was found not guilty and was acquitted on 12 April 1995.

Safa Giray died on 20 June 2011 in Ankara and was buried in Gölbaşı Cemetery following a state funeral in front of the Grand National Assembly of Turkey and a funeral service at the Kocatepe Mosque.

References

1931 births
2011 deaths
People from İzmir
Motherland Party (Turkey) politicians
Government ministers of Turkey
Ministers of Foreign Affairs of Turkey
Ministers of National Defence of Turkey
Turkish civil engineers
Istanbul Technical University alumni
Deputies of Istanbul
Deputies of Balıkesir
Ministers of Public Works of Turkey
Members of the 20th Parliament of Turkey
Members of the 45th government of Turkey
Members of the 46th government of Turkey
Members of the 47th government of Turkey
Members of the 48th government of Turkey